Zineb Redouani (born 12 June 2000) is a Moroccan footballer who plays as a defender for ASFAR and the Morocco women's national team.

Club career
Redouani has played for ASFAR in Morocco.

International career
Redouani has capped for Morocco at senior level during the Aisha Buhari Cup.

Honor 
 IFFHS Africa Team of The Year: 2022

See also
List of Morocco women's international footballers

References

External links
 
 
 

2000 births
Living people
Moroccan women's footballers
Women's association football defenders
Morocco women's international footballers
21st-century Moroccan women